The Militant Christian Party was a political party in Italy. The party was founded following a split from the Christian Democracy ahead of the 1953 general election.

In the 1953 election, the party contested the Bari-Foggia constituency. The list of the party got 1,473 votes (0.16% of the votes in the constituency).

References

Defunct political parties in Italy
Christian political parties